The Innes Review is a biannual academic journal, published by Edinburgh University Press on behalf of the Scottish Catholic Historical Association in May and November of each year. It was founded in 1950 and covers the part played by the Catholic Church in Scottish history. It includes all aspects of Scottish history and culture, especially ones related to religious history.

The journal is named after Thomas Innes.

References

External links 
 
 

Edinburgh University Press academic journals
Publications established in 1950
Catholic studies journals
English-language journals
Biannual journals
1950 establishments in Scotland
Magazines published in Scotland
Catholic Church in Scotland